Khumbu is a region in northeastern Nepal close to Mount Everest.

Khumbu may also refer to:

 Khumbu district
 Khumbu Icefall
 Khumbu Glacier
 Khumbu Pasanglhamu, a rural municipality in Solukhumbu District, Nepal
 Khumbu people